The Nokia C2-06 is a mobile phone manufactured by Nokia. This is the first mobile phone released by Nokia that possesses a touchscreen in a "slider" form factor. Previously released touchscreen devices from Nokia using Series 40 Operating System have been in "candybar" form factor.

Features 
The key feature of this phone is touch and type and Dual SIM. It means that the phone has touch screen and alpha-numeric (12 key) keyboard but no navigation or soft keys. Other main features include: a 2.0-megapixel camera, Maps, Bluetooth 2.1 + EDR, Flash Lite 3.0 and MIDP Java 2.1 with additional Java APIs. The PC suite of Nokia C2-06 is same to Nokia C2-06. Updated versions of Phone Software, Nokia PC Suite and Ovi Store are found easily.

Specification sheet

References

External links
 Dual sim phones and most searched phones
 Nokia C2-06 Device specifications at Forum Nokia

Mobile phones introduced in 2011
C2-06
Mobile phones with user-replaceable battery
Slider phones